Cabeza guateada is a traditional earth oven dish from Argentina made with the head of a cow and condiments. For its preparation, the head, seasoned and protected with a blanket, is cooked in a pit in the ground.

See also

Pachamanca.

References

Argentine cuisine
Earth oven
Offal